The Marxist–Leninist Party of the Philippines is a communist party in the Philippines with an ongoing conflict with the Philippine government through its armed wing, the Rebolusyonaryong Hukbong Bayan (RHB).

The group, which operates mainly in Central Luzon, formed in 1998, when it broke away from the Communist Party of the Philippines because of ideological differences. 

The conflict is still ongoing,
 although incidents covered in the media focus more on incidents arising from the rivalry between RHB and NPA.

See also
 Communism in the Philippines
 Communist rebellion in the Philippines
 Communist armed conflicts in the Philippines

References 

Communist parties in the Philippines
Political parties established in 1998
1998 establishments in the Philippines